Thomas John Harban (born 12 November 1985) is an English footballer, who is currently without a club after being released from Halifax Town. He plays in defence.

Career
Harban has come through the youth ranks with Barnsley he has yet to make his first team debut.

On 3 October 2006, Thomas and fellow Barnsley teammate Ryan Laight joined Conference National side Tamworth on loan. Both Harban and Laight made their first appearance for Tamworth again Aldershot Town.

Harban joined Bradford City on loan on 25 July 2007, which expired at the end of the year. He played six league games for Bradford. After his loan deal was completed, Harban and his teammate Nathan Joynes, who was also on loan at Bradford, joined Halifax Town on a free transfer.

Notes

External links

1985 births
Living people
English footballers
Association football defenders
Barnsley F.C. players
Tamworth F.C. players
Bradford City A.F.C. players
Halifax Town A.F.C. players
FC Halifax Town players
English Football League players
National League (English football) players